Kevin René Tittel (born 4 February 1994) is a German footballer who plays as a goalkeeper for MSV Neuruppin.

References

External links
 

1994 births
Footballers from Hamburg
Living people
German footballers
Association football goalkeepers
Chemnitzer FC players
VfB Lübeck players
1. FC Phönix Lübeck players
3. Liga players
Regionalliga players
Oberliga (football) players